Wilder 'n' Wilder (also released as Softly with Feeling) is an album led by jazz trumpeter Joe Wilder recorded in 1956 and first released on the Savoy label.

Reception

The Allmusic review by Stephen Cook stated: "The quartet effortlessly works through six cuts ... While Wilder takes quality solos throughout, especially on the slower cuts, Jones matches him track for track with his own elegantly swinging and thoughtful statements. One of the best of the trumpeter's early dates".

Track listing
 "Cherokee" (Ray Noble) – 10:38
 "Prelude to a Kiss" (Duke Ellington, Irving Gordon, Irving Mills) – 5:00
 "My Heart Stood Still" (Richard Rodgers, Lorenz Hart) – 4:30
 "Six Bit Blues" (Ozzie Cadena) – 8:26
 "Mad About the Boy" (Noël Coward) – 4:28
 "Darn That Dream" (Jimmy Van Heusen, Eddie DeLange) – 4:59

Personnel
Joe Wilder – trumpet 
Hank Jones – piano
Wendell Marshall – bass 
Kenny Clarke – drums

References

Savoy Records albums
Joe Wilder albums
1956 albums
Albums produced by Ozzie Cadena
Albums recorded at Van Gelder Studio